Under Cover is the ninth studio album by English heavy metal vocalist Ozzy Osbourne. The album consists entirely of cover songs, with an emphasis on rock music from the 1960s and 1970s. This is Osbourne's first and only album to feature cover songs from various artists, although in 1982, Osbourne released the live album Speak of the Devil featuring renditions of songs from his time with Black Sabbath. All but four songs were originally released in the box set Prince of Darkness, released earlier the same year. The additional songs are "Rocky Mountain Way", "Sunshine of Your Love", "Woman" and "Go Now". Whilst he cites The Beatles as his favourite band, his favourite song of all time is Procol Harum's "A Whiter Shade of Pale". He had wished to cover this song but was advised against it since it had recently been covered by a "close musical associate"  (then-former guitarist Zakk Wylde covered the song with his band Black Label Society on their 2004 album Hangover Music Vol. VI).

Under Cover is the only Osbourne album to feature the work of Alice in Chains' guitarist Jerry Cantrell or bassist Chris Wyse.

The album is also available in DualDisc format. This version contains the bonus track "Changes" (originally by Black Sabbath), performed by Osbourne and his daughter Kelly Osbourne. The DVD side contains all the songs in enhanced stereo, a documentary entitled Dinner with Ozzy and Friends, and a video for the song "In My Life".

"Mississippi Queen" was released as a promo single and peaked at number 10 on the Hot Mainstream Rock Tracks.

Track listing

Personnel
Ozzy Osbourne – vocals
Jerry Cantrell – guitars
Chris Wyse – bass
Mike Bordin – drums

Guest musicians
Ian Hunter – vocals on "All the Young Dudes"
Leslie West – guitar solo on "Mississippi Queen"
Robert Randolph – pedal steel on "Sympathy for the Devil", guitar solo on "21st Century Schizoid Man"

Additional musicians
Gregg Bissonette, Joe Bonamassa, Bogie Bowles, Tabby Callaghan, Louis Conte, Jim Cox, Madison Derek, Steve Dudas, Molly Foote, Mark Hudson, Sarah Hudson, Michael Landau, James Mastro, Paul Santo, Bruce Sugar

Production
Produced by Mark Hudson
Arrangements by Steve Dudas
Engineered and mixed by Bruce Sugar
Additional engineering – Kevin Churko and David Frangioni
Assistant engineers – Jimmy Hoyson, Ghian Wright, Peter Doris, Charlie Paakkari, Jason Agel, Geoff Rice, Andy Brohard, Devin Workman, Alex Scannell
Mastered by George Marino
A&R – Kaz Utsunomiya
Art direction – David Coleman
Cover photo – Kevin Westenberg
Tray photo – Dennis Keeley
Back cover photo – Myriam Santos-Kayda
Interior photos – Myriam Santos-Kayda, Sam Taylor Wood, Bil Zelman

Charts

Album

Singles

References

External links
 

Ozzy Osbourne albums
Covers albums
2005 compilation albums
Epic Records compilation albums
Albums produced by Mark Hudson (musician)
Albums recorded at Capitol Studios